Royal Albert Hall October 10, 1997 is a live album by space rock group Spiritualized from their 1997 tour of the United Kingdom, recorded during an October show at the Royal Albert Hall in London. The album was released in late 1998.

This was the last album recorded with the original Spiritualized line-up before frontman Jason Pierce sacked every member apart from keyboardist Thighpaulsandra and saxophonist Ray Dickaty.

The six-piece band are joined by a horn section, string quartet and members of the London Community Gospel Choir on disc two, with 19 members in total. This expanded version of Spiritualized headlined Glastonbury in 1998, and was also filmed on Later... with Jools Holland. This orchestral line-up signalled the dense musical style to come on their next album Let It Come Down, released 3 years later.

The majority of the setlist comes from Ladies And Gentlemen We Are Floating In Space, their third album, with some material from their previous albums, Lazer Guided Melodies and Pure Phase. "Walking With Jesus" was a Spacemen 3 song from The Perfect Prescription, but Pierce has performed it throughout his career. Here is its second official live release, the first being on the limited edition live release Fucked Up Inside in 1993.

Track listing

Disc one (45:59)
"Intro" – 4:18
"Shine a Light" – 7:11
"Electric Mainline" – 7:01
"Electricity" – 3:25
"Home of the Brave" – 3:31
"The Individual" – 2:57
"Medication" – 6:37
"Walking with Jesus" – 4:18
"Take Your Time" – 6:44

Disc two (49:16)
"No God Only Religion" – 4:02
"Broken Heart" – 5:47
"Come Together" – 7:00
"I Think I'm in Love" – 10:05
"Cop Shoot Cop..." – 16:33
"Oh Happy Day" – 5:52

All songs written by Jason Pierce, except:
 "Walking with Jesus" by Peter Kember and Jason Pierce
 "Oh Happy Day" by Philip Doddridge and Edward Francis Rimbault

Personnel
Spiritualized
 J Spaceman – Fender Thinline guitar, vocals
 Sean Cook – Fender Jazz bass guitar, harmonica
 Michael Mooney – Les Paul guitar, bass guitar
 Damon Reece – Gretsch Round Badge drums
 Thighpaulsandra – piano, Hammond C3
 Raymond (Moonshake) Dickaty – tenor saxophone, flute

Additional
 Choir director: John Fisher
 Soprano singers: Michelle Parkinson, Maulin Fisher, Denise Seally, Naterlie Goode
 Alto singers: Janice Whyne, Rhoda Fisher, Samantha McCrae
 Tenor singers: Jason Thompson, Leon Brown, Paul Bernard, Tony Clarke
 Horns: Tony Robinson, Rob Charles, Don Owen, Kevin Brown
 Strings: Jules Singleton, Sally Herbert, Jocelyn Pook, Dinah Beamish

References

1998 live albums
Spiritualized albums
Dedicated Records live albums
Live albums recorded at the Royal Albert Hall